Schiedlberg is a municipality in the district of Steyr-Land in the Austrian state of Upper Austria.

Geography
Schiedlberg lies in the Traunviertel. About 12 percent of the municipality is forest, and 80 percent is farmland.

Neighbouring villages
 north - Sankt Marien
 east - Wolfern
 south - Sierning
 southwest - Rohr im Kremstal
 west - Piberbach

Buildings
Schiedlberg Parish Church

References

Cities and towns in Steyr-Land District